Theodoxus prevostianus is a species of small freshwater snail with an operculum, an aquatic gastropod mollusk in the family Neritidae, the nerites.

Distribution
This species occurs in:
 Austria
 Hungary
 Slovenia
 Croatia - regionally extinct
 Romania - regionally extinct

Description

References

Further reading
 Fehér Z., Zettler M. L., Bozsó M. & Szabó K. (2009). "An attempt to reveal the systematic relationship between Theodoxus prevostianus (C. Pfeiffer, 1828) and Theodoxus danubialis (C. Pfeiffer, 1828) (Mollusca, Gastropoda, Neritidae)". Mollusca 27: 95-107.

Neritidae
Gastropods described in 1828